Aspen Hills, Alberta may refer to:

Aspen Hills, Parkland County, Alberta, a locality in Parkland County, Alberta
Aspen Hills, Lac Ste. Anne County, Alberta, a locality in Lac Ste. Anne County, Alberta